Aris Thessaloniki Water Polo Club is a Water Polo Club from Thessaloniki, Greece, part of A.S. Aris Thessaloniki multi-sport club. Aris currently participates in the second division, but it is the 4th most successful team in championship titles in Greece. Its home ground is Poseidoneio Hall in Thessaloniki.

Honours
Greek League
 Winners (4): 1927–28, 1928–29, 1929–30, 1931–32
 Runners-up  (1): 1930–31 

Greek Cup
 Runners-up  (2): 1954–55, 1984–85

External links
Official Amateur Club website

Water polo clubs in Greece